The SHINE Awards ("Sexual Health in Entertainment") are annual media awards given by The Media Project since the mid-1980s, resulting from a partnership between the Kaiser Family Foundation and Advocates for Youth.  They honor "those in the entertainment industry who do an exemplary job incorporating accurate and honest portrayals of sexuality into their programming."

References

 David Proval: 'Reality TV' means honest depictions of sexuality, USA Today, October 24, 2002
 In Development, A&U magazine, October 2004

External links
 Official website

Adult industry awards